This is a list of hospitals in Malawi.

Central hospitals
These hospitals serve as Regional Referral Hospitals for the District Hospitals.

 Blantyre Central Hospital (Queen Elizabeth Central Hospital)
Kamuzu Central Hospital
 Mzuzu Central Hospital
 Zomba Central Hospital

District hospitals
The district hospitals serve as referral hospitals for the health centres in their districts.

 Chitipa District Hospital
 Karonga District Hospital
 Mzimba District Hospital
 Nkhata Bay District Hospital
 Rumphi District Hospital
 Dedza District Hospital
 Dowa District Hospital
 Kasungu District Hospital
 Mchinji District Hospital
 Nkhokota District Hospital
 Ntcheu District Hospital
 Ntchisi District Hospital
 Salima District Hospital
 Balaka District Hospital
 Chikwawa District Hospital
 Chiradzulu District Hospital
 Machinga District Hospital
 Mangochi District Hospital
 Mulanje District Hospital
 Mwanza District Hospital
 Nsanje District Hospital
 Phalombe District Hospital
 Thyolo District Hospital
 Zomba District Hospital

Private specialized hospitals
 Mercy James Institute for Pediatric Surgery and Intensive Care

Other private hospitals
The following are some of the private hospitals in Malawi.
Discovery Imaging Centre
 Beit Cure International Hospital, Blantyre
 Shifa Hospital, Blantyre
 Billy Riordan Memorial Clinic, Chembe (Cape McLear) 
 Blantyre Adventist Hospital, Blantyre 
 Care Polyclinic Limited, Lilongwe
  Mlambe Mission Hospital, Lunzu, Blantyre
 CCK Health Clinic & Diagnostic Centre, Lilongwe
 Chitawira Private Hospital, Blantyre
 Daeyang Luke Hospital, Lilongwe 
 David Gordon Memorial Hospital, Salima
 Dr YB Mlombe Pvt Clinic, Chilinde 2, Lilongwe
 Francisco Palau Hospital, Lilongwe 
 Gulf Medical College Hospital, Blantyre
 Holy Family Mission Hospital, Phalombe
 Malamulo Hospital, Thyolo 
 Medicare Hospital, Blantyre 
 Mlolera Women's Health Clinic Limited, Lilongwe
 Montfort Hospital, Nchalo
 Mulanje Mission Hospital, Mulanje
 Mtengo Umodzi Private Hospital, Blantyre
 Mwaiwathu Private Hospital, Blantyre
 Nkhoma Mission Hospital, Lilongwe
 Nyambadwe Private Hospital, Blantyre
 St. Annies Mission Hospital, Karonga
 St. Joseph Hospital (Ludzi Hospital), Mchinji
 St. Joseph's Hospital, Limbe
 St. Luke's Hospital, Zomba
 St. Martin’s Mission Hospital, Malindi
 Wemaht Private Hospital, Blantyre.

References

External links
Website of the Malawi Ministry of Health

Malawi
Lists of buildings and structures in Malawi
Malawi